Robert Wilkes (June 24, 1832 – August 16, 1880) was an Irish-Canadian politician and businessman.  Born in Tullaghan, County Leitrim, Ireland, Wilkes came to Toronto from his native Ireland at sixteen, working as a clerk before buying a jewelry firm, Rossin Brothers, which he expanded into a cross-country operation.  He later invested in railroads, and in 1871 he was appointed director of the Canadian Bank of Commerce.

In 1872 he was elected Member of Parliament for Toronto Centre, as a Liberal.  The election was regarded by observers on both sides as rife with enmity, bribery and corruption.  In 1874 he was re-elected, but the return was voided and he retired from politics.

References 

 Donald Swainson, "Robert Wilkes" Dictionary of Canadian Biography online, 2000

External links 
 

1832 births
1880 deaths
Members of the House of Commons of Canada from Ontario
Liberal Party of Canada MPs